Siniyah Island is a natural island situated off the coast of the Emirate of Umm Al Quwain in the United Arab Emirates (UAE). It is the site of the oldest pearl fishing town in the Persian Gulf, as well as of an Eastern Christian Monastery and Bishop's Palace. The island's name means 'flashing lights', thought to be a reference to the harsh sunlight of the area.

Abandonment 
Following several distinct periods of human occupation, Siniyah was eventually abandoned in the 1820s as a result of British bombardment of the settlement as part of the Persian Gulf campaign of 1819, in which a British expeditionary force blew up the town of Ras Al Khaimah before destroying fortifications and the larger boats of the towns of Umm Al Quwain, Ajman, Fasht, Sharjah, Abu Hail, and Dubai on the 17th and 18th January 1820.

Pearl town 

Siniyah encloses the Khor Al Beida marshland and mangrove swamp off the coast of Umm Al Quwain. Archaeologists located the remains of the oldest known pearl fishing town in the Gulf on the island, identifying a major settlement of some 12 hectares, comprising a number of houses built of rock and lime mortar. The site is thought to be one of the largest such settlements of its time, comparable to the city of Julfar in Ras Al Khaimah. 

The nature of the houses, some larger and more complex than numerous smaller homes, suggests social stratification and finds point to year-round settlement and a linkage to the nearby Christian monastery. 

Finds at the site have included loose pearls and pearl diver's weights, used to speed divers' swim from the surface down to the pearl beds, as well as an extensive pearl shell midden thought to contain millions of shells.

Dated to the late C6th or early C7th CE both using radio carbon and comparative dating techniques on pottery sherds, and therefore predating the rise of Islam, the town was likely Christian. It maintained extensive global trading links, with finds of ceramics, in particular, yielding an unusually high proportion of Indian ware. The nearby settlements at Ed Dur and Tell Abraq have also yielded a number of finds that point to extensive regional and global trading links over the past 5,000 years.

Monastery 
The monastery at Siniyah is the second such found in the UAE, following the discovery of a monastery on Abu Dhabi’s Sir Bani Yas Island. It is one of six such monasteries so far identified on the coastal Persian Gulf  and has been dated between 534 and 656 CE. The Siniyah monastic complex included a kitchen, storerooms, a water cistern and an oven, thought to have been used to bake communion wafers. A large house forms part of the complex and has been dubbed a 'Bishop's Palace'. Finds at the site include an altar and a nearby cistern thought to have been used for baptisms. Large glass chalices found at the site are thought to have been used to celebrate the Eucharist.

Parallels have been drawn between the monks of the region and their practices and those of C6th monastic communities of Iona in Scotland. Over time, the Christian community waned at Siniyah as the influence of Islam grew across the Arabian Gulf Peninsula.

Future development 
The government of Umm Al Quwain has announced a Dh2.47 billion development project which will add major infrastructure, including leisure, hotel and residential properties to the island, which is currently uninhabited. The project includes the construction of a two-way three-land bridge between the mainland and the island, which is an environmentally as well as archaeologically important site, being home to one of the largest remaining colonies of Socotra Cormorants in the world.

References 

History of the United Arab Emirates
Umm Al Quwain articles
Umm Al Quwain
Archaeology of the United Arab Emirates
Geography of the United Arab Emirates